Rhenish Palatinate may refer to:

 Rhenish Palatinate, a name for the Palatinate region (Pfalz), Rhineland-Palatinate, Germany
 The Electoral Palatinate, a state that existed until 1803
 Rhenish Palatinate, another name for the Circle of Rhine (Rheinkreis) or the Bavarian Palatinate (Bayerischen Pfalz) west of the Rhine, from 1835 until 1946

See also 
 Rheinpfalz (disambiguation)
 Rhine Palatinate (wine region), the former name of the Palatinate wine region, Germany

de:Rheinpfalz